The empire, domain or lordship of King Garabito was a vast territory controlled by Huetar King Garabito and that extended through most of the Central Valley of Costa Rica from the Virilla River (natural border with the also Huetar but smaller Señorío del Guarco) in modern San José to the Atlantic Slope in what is now the north of the country (Alajuela, Grecia and San Carlos mainly). Garabito's domain transcended the borders of the Western Huetar Kingdom where it had multiple vassal populations such as Coyoche, Abacara, Chucasque, Cobobici (possibly Corobicí), Cobux, Yurustí and Barva, and also included several submissive peoples but not incorporated into their kingdom; the Botos, Tises and Catapas.

Although the exact location of its capital is unknown, it is speculated that it could be in San Ramón near where it made war raids against the botos. The empire was also an enemy of the also vast Kingdom of Nicoya, of ethnic chorotega unrelated to the huétares but with the Nahuas instead and that represented other of the largest pre-Hispanic Costa Rican empires.

Garabito presented a fierce resistance to the Spanish conquering expansions, considerably delaying the process of conquest and colonization and causing many headaches to the Spanish governors such as Juan de Cavallón and Vázquez de Coronado, but he would finally be defeated and his domain annexed to the governorship of Costa Rica under the name that the Spanish designated as Garabito province.

References

Former monarchies of Costa Rica
16th century in Costa Rica
Indigenous peoples in Costa Rica
Former empires